Da Dong Roast Duck Restaurant (Chinese: 北京大董烤鸭店, Pinyin: Běijīng dà dǒng kǎoyā diàn) is a Chinese restaurant located in Dongcheng District, Beijing. The restaurant is named after its founder Dong Zhenxiang (董振祥), who bears the nickname "Da Dong" (大董).

It is widely known for its Chinese cuisine, especially Peking duck. Da Dong has contributed towards innovating methods of cooking Peking duck by using a spherical wood fired oven instead of the more traditional method of a square oven, and the innovated roast duck is called "SuperLean" (酥不腻) Roast Duck. In 2014 the eatery was named the best Chinese cooking style restaurant in Beijing by The Beijinger.

Da Dong has been rated within the top ten best Peking duck serving restaurants in Beijing by various food critics. It was also listed as a suggestion for Bucket lists in the book 1,000 Places to See before you die by Patricia Schultz.

Awards 
 Beijing Restaurant of the Year (2014) – The Beijinger
 Travellers choice awards (2014) – TripAdvisor
 Food Award Winner (2011) – Time Out Beijing
 Top 10 Beijing restaurants (2015) – Gayot

See also 
 Bianyifang
 Quanjude
 List of restaurants in China

References

External links 
 

Restaurants in Beijing